An augmented triad is a chord, made up of two major thirds (an augmented fifth). The term augmented triad arises from an augmented triad being considered a major chord whose top note (fifth) is raised.  When using popular-music symbols, it is indicated by the symbol "+" or "aug". For example, the augmented triad built on C, written as C+, has pitches C–E–G:The chord can be represented by the integer notation {0, 4, 8}.

Analysis
Whereas a major triad, such as C–E–G, contains a major third (C–E) and a minor third (E–G), with the interval of the fifth (C–G) being perfect, the augmented triad has an augmented fifth, becoming C–E–G. In other words, the top note is raised a semitone. H.R. Palmer notes:

The augmented chord on I may contain the major seventh (I or I), while the augmented chord on V may contain the minor seventh (V, V, or V). In C: C–E–G–B and G–B–D–F.

The augmented triad on the V may be used as a substitute dominant, and may also be considered as III+. The example below shows III+ as a substitute dominant in a ii-V-I turnaround in C major.

In popular music
Examples of popular music songs featuring the augmented chord include its  use in the introduction of Chuck Berry's "School Days", Aaron Neville's "Tell It Like It Is", The Beatles' "Oh! Darling", after intros in Gene Pitney's "Town Without Pity", The Beach Boys' "The Warmth of the Sun", Joe Cocker's "Delta Lady", at the end of the bridge in Patience and Prudence's "Tonight You Belong to Me", The Caravelles' "You Don't Have to Be a Baby to Cry", The Beatles' "From Me to You", The Dave Clark Five's "Glad All Over", and Martha and the Vandellas' "Dancing in the Street". One of the few examples of an augmented chord on the opening downbeat is in the Carmen Lombardo song "Seems Like Old Times": in Barber Shop Memories, Book 2 the 4-part vocal score for the song  (in the key of F) uses B–D–F to harmonize the downbeat as IV+ (the enharmonic equivalent of VI+). An augmented chord also harmonizes the opening downbeat of the chorus of the 1908 song "Shine On, Harvest Moon", heard at the beginning of the 1931 recording by Ruth Etting.Other examples of the augmented chord include its use as a chromatic passing function over the first degree, the  rising to  then  harmonized as IV, as in Jay and the Americans' "Some Enchanted Evening", Lesley Gore's "It's My Party" (I – I+ – IV – iv) (see also minor major seventh chord), Herman's Hermits' "There's a Kind of Hush" (continues to 7 harmonized by Im7), by ii Roy Orbison's "Crying", followed by 6 – 6 – 5 motion in "Crying", The Guess Who's "Laughing", Dave Clark Five's "Because" (verse: I – I+ – vi – Im7... ii and cadence on V+), The Monkees' "Tapioca Tundra" (I – I+ – vi, and V+ after bridge). 

Though rare, the augmented chord occurs in rock music "almost always as a linear embellishment linking an opening tonic chord with the next chord", for example John Lennon's "(Just Like) Starting Over" and The Beatles' "All My Loving". Thus, with an opening tonic chord, an augmented chord results from ascending or descending movement between the fifth and sixth degrees, such as in the chord progression I – I+ – vi. This progression forms the verse for Oasis's 2005 single "Let There Be Love" (I – I+ – vi – IV)

In classical music
The augmented triad differs from the other kinds of triad (the major triad, the minor triad, and the diminished triad) in that it does not naturally arise in a diatonic scale. Although it could be conceptualized as a triad built on the third degree of a harmonic minor scale or melodic minor scale, it virtually never occurs in this way (since any chord on the third degree is itself rare, usually being a new tonic).

This rarity makes the augmented triad a special chord that touches on the atonal. Its uses to 'suspend' tonality are famous; for example, in Franz Liszt's Faust Symphony, in Richard Wagner's Siegfried Idyll, and in Arnold Schoenberg's "Walzer" (Fünf Klavierstücke Op. 23 No. 5).  However, the augmented triad occurs in tonal music, with a perfectly tonal meaning, since at least J.S. Bach (see the first chord in the opening chorus to his cantata Ach Gott, vom Himmel sieh darein, BWV 2) and Joseph Haydn (see, for example, the Trio from Haydn's String Quartet Op. 54 No. 2).  It results diatonically in minor mode from a dominant chord where the fifth (the second degree) is replaced by the third degree, as an anticipation of the resolution chord. Ludwig van Beethoven's Symphony No. 9 features such a chord at key moments in the slow movement. Johannes Brahms's Tragic Overture also features the chord prominently (A–C–E), in alternation with the regular dominant (A–C–E). In this example one can also see other aspect of the appeal of the chord to composers: it is a 'conflation' of the fifth degree and the third degree, the usual contrasting keys of a piece in the minor mode.

With the lead of Franz Schubert (in his Wanderer Fantasy), Romantic composers started organizing many pieces by descending major thirds, which can be seen as a large-scale application of the augmented triad (although it probably arose from other lines of development not necessarily connected to the augmented triad). This kind of organization is common; in addition to Schubert, it is found in music of Franz Liszt, Nikolai Rimsky-Korsakov, Louis Vierne and Richard Wagner, among others.

Tuning
In just intonation, the interval between two major thirds and an octave, 2:(5:4)2, is 32:25, which is flatter by a septimal kleisma of size 225:224 than the septimal major third with ratio 9:7. While septimal meantone temperament tempers out the septimal kleisma, some other temperaments, for example miracle temperament, do so also, and in all of these temperaments the augmented triad may be identified with a circle of two major and one septimal major thirds, making up an octave.

Augmented chord table
{| class="wikitable"
!Chord
!Root
!Major third
!Augmented fifth
|-
!Caug
|C
|E
|G
|-
!Caug
|C
|E
|G
|-
!Caug
|C
|E (F)
|G (A)
|-
!Daug
|D
|F
|A
|-
!Daug
|D
|F
|A
|-
!Daug
|D
|F (G)
|A (B)
|-
!Eaug
|E
|G
|B
|-
!Eaug
|E
|G
|B (C)
|-
!Eaug
|E
|G (A)
|B (C)
|-
!Faug
|F
|A
|C
|-
!Faug
|F
|A
|C
|-
!Faug
|F
|A
|C (D)
|-
!Gaug
|G
|B
|D
|-
!Gaug
|G
|B
|D
|-
!Gaug
|G
|B (C)
|D (E)
|-
!Aaug
|A
|C
|E
|-
!Aaug
|A
|C
|E (F)
|-
!Aaug
|A
|C (D)
|E (F)
|-
!Baug
|B
|D
|F
|-
!Baug
|B
|D
|F (G)
|-
!Baug
|B
|D (E)
|F (G)
|}

See also 
Altered chord
Diminished triad
Giant Steps (composition) and Coltrane changes

Notes

Further reading 
 
 

Chords
Musical symmetry